A referendum on the United Arab Republic was held in Egypt on 21 February 1958, alongside a simultaneous referendum in Syria. The referendum consisted of two questions; one on the formation of the UAR, and the other on Gamal Abdel Nasser's candidacy for the post of President of the UAR. Both were approved, with fewer than 300 votes against and a 98.1% voter turnout.

Results

United Arab Republic

Nasser for President

References

Referendum
Egypt
Referendums in the United Arab Republic
Single-candidate elections
Egypt